William James Macdonald (born 17 September 1976) is a Scottish former professional footballer who played in the Scottish Premier Division for Partick Thistle and Dunfermline Athletic.

Career
Having been an apprentice pro at West Bromwich Albion under Ossie Ardiles and Keith Burkinshaw, Macdonald returned to Scotland and made his first league appearances for Partick Thistle in the Scottish Premier Division. Macdonald made headlines after a match against Rangers where he received a red card for a late altercation with Paul Gascoigne although he received the sponsors man of the match award for the same game. Thistle were relegated via a play-off at the end of the 1995–96 season but Macdonald remained at Firhill for two further years. After leaving Thistle, Macdonald had a brief spell in Finland with FF Jaro before making one Premier Division appearance for Dunfermline Athletic then having short spells at several clubs in the Scottish Football League.

Macdonald spent three seasons at Stranraer and was appointed club captain under manager Billy McLaren. He joined Queen of the South in September 2004 but never made a league appearance and was eventually forced to retire due to a cruciate injury.

After coaching locally, Macdonald was appointed manager of hometown team  Lesmahagow in November 2015 but left this role in April the following year. He has since been part of manager Andy Frame's coaching staff at Thorniewood United and Cumbernauld United.

References

External links

Living people
1976 births
Scottish footballers
Scottish Premier League players
Scottish Football League players
Scottish football managers
Veikkausliiga players
West Bromwich Albion F.C. players
Partick Thistle F.C. players
Dunfermline Athletic F.C. players
Livingston F.C. players
Clydebank F.C. (1965) players
Stranraer F.C. players
Alloa Athletic F.C. players
FF Jaro players
Queen of the South F.C. players
Scottish expatriate footballers
Expatriate footballers in Finland
Association football midfielders